is a railway station on the Nippō Main Line in Hyūga, Miyazaki, Japan, operated by Kyushu Railway Company (JR Kyushu).

Basic information
Hyūgashi Station is located at the heart of Hyuga, Miyazaki. The current station is a timber-steel hybrid structure built in 2008 by Naito Architecture & Associates. It was built as a functional train station and also with the intention of being a symbol of the city.

History
It was renamed Hyūgashi Station on 25 May 1963. With the privatization of Japanese National Railways (JNR) on 1 April 1987, the station came under the control of JR Kyushu.

Awards
 In 2008, Hyugashi Station received the Brunel Award for beautiful station architecture.
 In 2009, Hyugashi Station received the BCS Prize for architectural excellence.

Surrounding area
The area in and around the station is regularly used for events and festivals.

See also
 List of railway stations in Japan

References

External links

 JR Kyushu station information 

Railway stations in Miyazaki Prefecture
Stations of Kyushu Railway Company
Railway stations in Japan opened in 1921